was a Japanese politician of the Liberal Democratic Party and business executive.

A business executive who symbolized "big business" in Japan as president of Dai Nippon Sugar Manufacturing Co. and executive officer of Nitto Chemical Industry Co., he used his influence to bring about the fall of Prime Minister Hideki Tōjō in 1944.

After Japan's World War II surrender, Fujiyama was imprisoned without a trial for three years, having been accused of "war crimes". After his release he represented Japan at the 1951 UNESCO meeting in Paris.

Fujiyama was elected to Parliament in 1957 and was reelected five times. As Japan's foreign minister (1957–60) he headed Japan's first delegation to the United Nations (1957), helped revise the U.S.–Japan Security Treaty (1960), and promoted the restoration of diplomatic relations between Japan and China. He also served as director of Japan's Economic Planning Agency.

External links
 

|-

|-

|-

|-

|-

1897 births
1985 deaths
Foreign ministers of Japan
Members of the House of Representatives (Japan)
Japanese people of World War II
Economic planning ministers of Japan
Liberal Democratic Party (Japan) politicians
Grand Crosses 1st class of the Order of Merit of the Federal Republic of Germany
Keio University alumni